Fluororichterite is a rare amphibole with formula Na(NaCa)Mg5Si8O22F2.

Occurrence
Fluororichterite was first reported from the Ilmen Nature Reserve, Ilmen Mountains, Chelyabinsk Oblast', Southern Urals, Russia. It was recognized by the International Mineralogical Association in 1994. Its name is derived from its fluorine content and relation to richterite.

At the type locality in the Ilmen Mountains fluororichterite occurs in carbonate veins in amphibolites and ultramafic rocks. In the Essonville occurrence in Wilberforce, Ontario it occurs in a limestone lens within a gneiss and is associated with phlogopite and calcite. It has also been reported from Austria, Germany, Italy, Spain and China. At Coyote Peak in the Coastal Range, Humboldt County, California, it occurs with a variety of rare minerals in an alkaline mafic diatreme.

References 

Calcium minerals
Magnesium minerals
Sodium minerals
Fluorine minerals
Amphibole group
Monoclinic minerals
Minerals in space group 12